Cwmdare is a village very close to Aberdare, in Rhondda Cynon Taf, Wales. The village's history is intertwined with coal-mining, and since the decline of the industry in the 1980s, it has become primarily a commuter base for the larger surrounding towns of Aberdare and Merthyr Tydfil and Pontypridd, as well as the cities of Cardiff and Swansea.

Name 
The village's name translates to "Dare Valley". The Dare is tributary that flows down from the Darren mountain, down through the village and on to Aberdare (literally "Mouth Of The Dare"), where it joins the larger River Cynon, one of the largest tributaries of the River Taff.

History 
Before the exploitation of the South Wales Coalfield, Cwmdare was a scattering of a few houses and farms. However, in the 1850s, with the Industrial Revolution fuelling the demand for coal, several deep coal mines appeared in the area, and workers began to migrate there from other parts of Wales, as well as the South West of England.

The new miners needed housing, and between 1853 and 1859 the first streets were laid down on the west side of the Dare Valley, which would become the centre of the village of Cwmdare. A few houses were also built on the east side of the valley, near the Merthyr Dare Colliery, known as Pithead. As the collieries grew, Cwmdare grew with it; rows of terraced miners' cottages were built to the north-west of the original hamlet. Aberdare was described as "very remarkable" for the Taplasau Hâf (summer games) which took place on feast days at three sites set aside for such games. One of these sites was the Ton-glwyd-fawr (known locally as 'The Ton') in Cwmdare, now the site of a pub of the same name.

Cwmdare had four large collieries: the Cwmdare, Merthyr Dare and Bwllfa Dare collieries were all sunk in the 1850s, while work began on Nantmelyn Colliery in 1860. Over the next 120 years, the seams in the Maerdy mountain were gradually used up, with Merthyr Dare closing in 1884, Cwmdare in 1936, Nantmelin in 1957, and finally Bwllfa Dare in 1977.

Post-mining 
Since the mines closed, Cwmdare has become a residential satellite of nearby Aberdare, as well as Merthyr Tydfil, Cardiff and Swansea. There are almost no jobs in Cwmdare itself, so most residents commute to one of the larger towns for work.

Due to the redevelopment of the Dare Valley area in the 1970s, Cwmdare has become an attractive commuter village: it is near both of Wales' major urban centres, Cardiff and Swansea, and has good transport links, and attractive scenery. As a result, the population has increased rapidly, with much new-build housing, covering most of the east side of the Dare Valley, almost down to the river Dare itself.

Local amenities 
Despite its increased population, Cwmdare has few local amenities, and most residents rely on nearby Aberdare for most things. It does however have a local shop, a post office, and a pub, The Ton Glwyd Fawr Inn on the village square. In addition, as a reflection of the strong history of Nonconformism in South Wales mining areas, it has several chapels: Nebo, Elim, Gobaith and the Cwmdare Mission, as well as the Church In Wales St Luke's Church.

Cwmdare also has a variety of local schools, the oldest of which is Cwmdare Primary School, a respected English-medium primary school that teaches around 260 pupils from the ages of 4-11. In addition to this is Maesgwyn School, a school for pupils aged 11–19 with moderate learning difficulties, and Ysgol Gynradd Gymraeg Aberdâr – a Welsh-medium primary school that serves the upper Cynon Valley.

Dare Valley Country Park 

In 1970, when just one coal mine remained open, it was decided that the landscape on the west side of the valley, which had been destroyed by the mining industry for more than a century, should be returned to its original state. Over the next two years coal and slag tips were cleared, the River Dare was diverted, and the small mining hamlet of Pithead was demolished and two artificial lakes were created.

In 1973, the work was completed, and Dare Valley Country Park was opened to the public. It comprises 500 acres (2.0 km2) of woodlands, pasture and moorland mountainside. Paths and bridges make the area popular with walkers, families and dog-walkers, while those with an interest in industrial history can still find evidence of the area's mining past dotted about the landscape, including an old pit wheel, erected as a monument at the site of the Bwllfa Dare pit.
In 1985 a visitors' centre and camp site were built near the site of the old Merthyr Dare colliery. It features a café and 15 visitor rooms, as well as an exhibition that tells the story of Cwmdare's industrial and natural heritage.

See also 
 Aberdare
 Cynon Valley
 Dare Valley Country Park
 Aberdare High School
 PD Ports
 Mordecai Jones
 Iorwerth Thomas

References

External links 
www.geograph.co.uk : photos of Cwmdare and surrounding area
: Dare Valley Country Park website
: RCT Cwmdare History page
: Cwmdare Primary School Website

Villages in Rhondda Cynon Taf